Cari Higgins (born October 5, 1976) is an American former racing cyclist. Following her retirement from cycling, Higgins became a real estate agent.

In 2021, Higgins was appointed to USA Cycling's Board of Directors as an Athlete Representative.

Major results

2007
 National Track Championships
1st  Team sprint (with Liz Reap-Carlson)
3rd 500m time trial
2008
 National Track Championships
1st  500m time trial
1st  Keirin
1st  Sprint
1st  Team sprint (with Liz Reap-Carlson)
3rd Individual pursuit
2009
 Pan American Track Championships
2nd  Scratch
3rd  500m time trial
3rd  Keirin
3rd  Sprint
2010
 1st Stage 2 Tulsa Tough
 9th Overall Tour of America's Dairyland
1st Stage 1
2011
 2nd Overall Tour of America's Dairyland
 Pan American Track Championships
3rd  Omnium
3rd  Points race
2012
 National Track Championships
1st  Team pursuit (with Jacquelyn Crowell and Lauren Tamayo)
2nd Points race
 3rd  Team pursuit, Pan American Track Championships
 9th Overall Tour of America's Dairyland
1st Stage 7
2013
 1st  Points race, National Track Championships
 3rd Athens Twilight Criterium
 3rd Team pursuit, Los Angeles Grand Prix (with Elizabeth Newell, Lauren Tamayo and Jade Wilcoxson)
 5th Overall Tour of America's Dairyland
2014
 2nd  Team pursuit, 2013–14 UCI Track Cycling World Cup, Guadalajara
2015
 5th Overall Tour of America's Dairyland
1st Stage 6

References

External links

American female cyclists
Living people
1976 births
21st-century American women
American real estate brokers
University of Alabama alumni